Late Night Grande Hotel is the ninth studio album by American singer-songwriter Nanci Griffith. It was released in September 1991 by MCA Records. It was produced by Peter Van Hooke and Rod Argent, with a slightly more pop-oriented sound than previous albums. It also features vocal contributions from Phil Everly and Tanita Tikaram.

Reception

Writing for AllMusic, critic Lindsay Planer wrote of the album "While not her best disc during the late '80s/early '90s, Late Night Grande Hotel is a solid effort with some of her most mature material to date."

Track listing

Personnel 

Nanci Griffith - vocals, acoustic guitar
Blue Moon Orchestra
with:
Phil Everly - vocals on "It's Just Another Morning Here"
Tanita Tikaram - vocals on "It's Too Late"
Mo Foster - bass on "Heaven", "The Power Lines" and "Down 'N' Outer"
Mitch Dalton - classical guitar on "The Power Lines" and "Down 'N' Outer"
Rod Argent - string arrangements

References 

Nanci Griffith albums
1991 albums
Albums produced by Rod Argent
Albums produced by Peter Van Hooke
MCA Records albums